Sékou Fofana (born 26 September 1980) is a Malian football defender who last played for Alashkert FC in the Armenian Premier League.

Fofana featured for Mali at the 1997 FIFA U-17 World Championship.

References

1980 births
Living people
Malian footballers
Expatriate footballers in Iran
Shahin Bushehr F.C. players
Sanat Mes Kerman F.C. players
Mes Rafsanjan players
Sportspeople from Bamako
USM Annaba players
Expatriate footballers in Algeria
Iranjavan players
FC Alashkert players
Association football defenders
21st-century Malian people